Baal Hammon, properly Baʿal Ḥammon or Baʿal Ḥamon, meaning "Lord Hammon", was the chief god of Carthage. He was a weather god considered responsible for the fertility of vegetation and esteemed as King of the Gods. He was depicted as a bearded older man with curling ram's horns. Baʿal Ḥammon's female cult partner was Tanit.

Etymology
He is clearly identified as one of the Phoenician deities covered under the name of Baal. However, the meaning of his second name is unclear. Frank Moore Cross argued for a connection to Hamōn, the Ugaritic name for Mount Amanus, a peak in the Nur Mountains which separate Syria from Cilicia. In the 19th century, when Ernest Renan excavated the ruins of Hammon (Ḥammon), the modern Umm al-‘Awamid between Tyre and Acre, he found two Phoenician inscriptions dedicated to El-Hammon.

Others have proposed Hammon as a syncretic association with Libyan-Egyptian god Amun, while a last current has called instead for a connection with the Northwest Semitic word ḥammān ("brazier"), suggesting the sense "Lord of the Brazier".

Cult and attributes
The worship of Baʿal Hammon flourished in the Phoenician colony of Carthage.  His supremacy among the Carthaginian gods is believed to date to the fifth century BC, after relations between Carthage and Tyre were broken off at the time of the Battle of Himera (480 BC). Baal Hammon was known as the Chief of the pantheon of Carthage and the deity that made vegetation grow; as with most deities of Carthage, he was seemingly propitiated with child sacrifice, likely in times of strife or crisis, or only by elites, perhaps for the good of the whole community. This practice was recorded by Greeks and Romans, but dismissed as propaganda by modern scholars, until archeologists unearthed urns containing the cremated remains of infants in places of ritual sacrifice. Some scholars believe this confirms the accounts of child sacrifice, while others insist these are the remains of children who died young. 

He has been identified with a solar deity, although Yigael Yadin thought him to be a moon god. Edward Lipinski identifies him with the god Dagon. In Carthage and North Africa Baʿal Hammon was especially associated with the ram and was worshiped also as Baʿal Qarnaim ("Lord of Two Horns") in an open-air sanctuary at Jebel Boukornine ("the two-horned hill") across the bay from Carthage, in Tunisia.

The interpretatio graeca identified him with the Titan Cronus. In ancient Rome, he was identified with Saturn, and the cultural exchange between Rome and Carthage as a result of the Second Punic War may have influenced the development of the festival of Saturnalia.

. Attributes of his Romanized form as an African Saturn indicate that Hammon (Amunus in Philo's work) was a fertility god.

Legacy
There is a survival in modern times in onomastics with some first names in use particularly in Tunisia grafted onto the name of the god. Algerian, Tunisian and many other spoken forms of Arabic refer to " farming" to refer to non-irrigated agriculture. Such usage is attested in Hebrew, a Canaanite language sister to Phoenician, already in the 2nd century CE Mishnah.

A street in modern Carthage, located near the Punic Ports, bears the name of Baal Hammon.

See also
 Punic religion

References

External links

On-line parallel Bible: Song of Solomon 8:11

Hebrew Bible places
Child sacrifice
Carthaginian mythology
West Semitic gods
Cronus
Saturn (mythology)
Horned deities
Baal
Saturnian deities